Chilonia Union High School is a secondary school located in Chilonia Bazaar, Arjuntala Union, Senbagh Upazila, Noakhali District, Bangladesh. It is one of the oldest and most well-known school of Senbagh Upazila. The school offers education for students ranging from 6 to 10. The School has been successfully celebrated The Golden Jubilee (1968-2018) on March 30, 2018.

History 
In 1968, the school started its journey as a minor school on the north side of Chilonia Bazaar. The School Founder was Late. Dr. TI Nuruzzaman Chowdhury, a greatest person who is an initial step to enlighten education in Arjuntala Union. Initially, The school has educational activities in the small Tin shed. Gradually Increase the number of students, the area expands the spread of school.

Features 
At present, it has 1 oldest & 2 large buildings and 1 very oldest tin shed as well. There is a great field in the school area. There are about twenty teachers and other facilities including an auditorium, a  computer room, Shaheed Minar,  Modern Library and it provides modern equipments of lesson. The school has enriched  Science Laboratories. The authority also organizes the morning assembly, annual sports festival, annual prize giving ceremony, many religious festivals and different cultural events. The current Headmaster and the School Board of Directors take the organization's outstanding contribution to the place of higher education.

Admission 
Usually students are admitted in the sixth grade. Admission can be considered in other classes if a vacancy is available or if someone is transferred from some other school. Students who want to get admitted in this school must have passed in the previous grade and have the opportunity to go through an entrance examination. The admission is usually taken in the first week of January.

Curriculum 
This high school follows the  National Education Curriculum of Bangladesh (NCTB). The curriculum includes secondary academic subjects. Classes in computing are compulsory for grades 6-10. Students of secondary grades 9 to grades 10 classes elect to one of three major groups: Science, Commerce and Arts.

Sections 
From the very beginning, the school is continuing the classes with a single shift. Presently all the classes from 6 to 10 are running. However, all the grades from 6th to 8th has two sections: A & B. The 9th and 10th grade students are offered three different sections: Science, Commerce and Arts that can be selected by their own arbitrary.

Uniform 
Boy's: The uniform is a white shirt with black full pant and white shoes and black belt.

Girl's: The uniform is a blue frock, white pajama and white orna.

Both of Boy's & Girl's has a school monogram contained on the pocket of the school uniform.

Extracurricular activities 
 Red Crescent functions
 Games and sports (cricket, football)
 Cultural and Religious Programs
 Study tour
 Annual Game Competition

The Golden Jubilee (1968-2018) 
Celebration of the Golden Jubilee Festival of the day is organized 30 March, 2018. Over 1800 ex-students and current students alonged proced registered. On the occasion been celebrated 50 year anniversary of the Chilonia Union High School.  An Theme Song has been made for the occasion of Golden Jubilee of the school.  Renowned a Bangladeshi singer Milon Mahmood have been made Tune, Voices and Composition.

References 

High schools in Bangladesh
Schools in Noakhali District
Senbagh Upazila